Mərdəkan (Mardakan) is a settlement and municipality in Khazar raion of Baku, Azerbaijan with a population of 25,232. It's located on the eastern Absheron Peninsula only 30 km away from capital city Baku, bounded by the Caspian Sea to the north, Shuvalan to the east, Qala to the south, and Shagan to the west. Mardakan received the status of a settlement in 1936 . In 1933, Shagan village was included in the Mardakan village council, although it was separated in 1945, it was reunited in 1948, and in 1990, Shagan re-separated and received the status of a settlement.

Mardakan is known as summer city across the peninsula as many locals tend to visit the settlement during the summertime. It's also popular for its beaches, chill climate and recreational establishments.

History 
Mardakan is one of the oldest villages of the Absheron peninsula. It is named after a tribe called the Mards who lived in the area during the 1st century AD. Several traces of ancient settlements have been discovered close to the village. Some rocks in the area have paintings typical to the Bronze Age.

Places of interest 

The main points of interest of Mardakan are its castles with watchtowers, technically being keeps. There are two keeps   - one being with a round tower, the other with a quadrangular tower. These towers are parts of the general chain of towers and other fortresses over the Absheron peninsula. When enemies attacked, the tops of these towers were lit up with oil to warn the population of the approaching danger. The round tower was built in the 13th century and is 15.5 meters in diameter with three stories. The quadrangular tower dates from 14th century and is about 25 meters tall with five stories.

Mardakan is the favorite places for building dacha summer cottages for Baku residents. The tradition to build cottages in Mardakan dates back to the 19th century when business magnates from the emerging oil industry began to build extravagant summer houses. Nowadays, the construction boom in Mardakan continues with a wave of newly made generation of businessmen, who keep the tradition of transforming old Absheron style architecture dachas with architecture from Europe, such as French and Mediterranean house building manner. As in old days, French architecture stands out among all other architecture styles followed in the construction of summer cottages, with a whole new White City project in down town of the capital of Azerbaijan, which is purely French architecture.

Mardakan has a favourable microclimate for growing fruits and vegetables. This has attracted several plantations, one of them being the Mardakan Arboretum.

Other key attractions include: 
 The Tuba-Shakha mosque from the 15th century
 The house and museum of Sergei Yesenin 
 The summer house and grave of the oil magnate Zeynalabdin Taghiyev

Notable natives 
Zeynalabdin Taghiyev

International relations

Twin towns – Sister cities
Mərdəkan is twinned with
 Nadarzyn, Poland

Photos

References 

Populated places in Baku